The 1993 Australian Touring Car Championship was a CAMS sanctioned Australian motor racing title for Group 3A Touring Cars. The championship, which was the 34th Australian Touring Car Championship, was contested over a nine-round series which began on 28 February 1993 at Amaroo Park and ended on 8 August at Oran Park Raceway. Promoted as the Shell Australian Touring Car Championship, it was won by Glenn Seton, driving a Ford EB Falcon, with teammate Alan Jones completing a one-two championship result for Glenn Seton Racing. It was Seton's first championship victory and the first major victory for the team he had started in 1989.

1993 marked the first year in which the championship was contested by the new Australian Group 3A Touring Car category which incorporated: 
 5.0 Litre Touring Cars (later to be known as V8 Supercars) 
 2.0 Litre Class II Touring Cars (later to be known as Super Touring Cars) 
 Normally aspirated, two wheel drive cars complying with the 1992 CAMS Group 3A regulations (commonly known as Group A cars)

Television coverage
Channel Seven broadcast the championship with the commentary team including Mike Raymond, Gary Wilkinson, Mark Oastler, Doug Mulray and Andy Raymond. Regular commentator Neil Crompton was absent as he was contesting the full series as a competitor for the first time.

Teams and drivers
The following drivers and teams competed in the 1993 Australian Touring Car Championship.

Race calendar
The championship was contested over a nine-round series. Each round consisted of a "Peter Jackson Dash" for the top six cars from Qualifying, a Heat for the 2.0 Litre Class, a Heat for the 5.0 Litre Class and a combined Final.  The two Class Heats were run separately at Round 1 but were combined from Round 2 onwards.

Points system
Championship points were awarded at each round on the following basis:
 3 to the driver recording fastest time in Qualifying
 3–2–1 to the first three finishers in the Peter Jackson Dash
 9–6–4–3–2–1 to the first six finishers in each Class in the Heat
 20–16–14–12–10–8–6–4–2–1 to the first ten outright finishers in the Final

Championship standings

Peter Jackson Dash
The Peter Jackson Dash series award was won jointly by Mark Skaife and Glenn Seton.

Australian 2.0 Litre Touring Car Championship

The 1993 Australian 2.0 Litre Touring Car Championship, which was contested concurrently with the 1993 Australian Touring Car Championship, was won by Peter Doulman driving a BMW M3.

See also
 1993 Australian Touring Car season

References

External links
 Official V8 Supercar site
 Cars Touring Car images at www.autopics.com.au

Australian Touring Car Championship seasons
Touring Cars
1993 in V8 Supercars